= Behlana =

Coordinates: 30°40′49″N 76°47′49″E

Behlana is a village in Chandigarh district in the Union Territory of Chandigarh, India.

The village has a population of 8,281- 4,711 males and 3,570 females (from the 2011 Indian census). The village has a high school and a branch bank.
